The Independence Bowl is a post-season National Collegiate Athletic Association (NCAA)-sanctioned Division I college football bowl game that is played annually each December at Independence Stadium in Shreveport, Louisiana. The Independence Bowl was named because it was inaugurated in 1976, the year of the United States Bicentennial. The bowl's current title sponsor is Radiance Technologies, per an agreement announced for the 2020–2025 editions. Only one prior edition of the bowl, in 2013, has not used Independence Bowl branding.

The 2020 edition of the bowl was canceled on December 20, 2020, due to an insufficient number of teams being available to fill all 2020-21 bowl games, following a season impacted by the COVID-19 pandemic.

Conference tie-ins
For its first five years, the game pitted the champion of the Southland Conference against an at-large opponent. It then moved to inviting two at-large teams, until 1995 when it began featuring a Southeastern Conference (SEC) school against an at-large opponent.

From 1998 to 2009, the game normally featured a matchup between teams representing the Big 12 Conference and the SEC. Teams from other conferences were included only if one of those leagues did not have enough bowl-eligible teams to fill its spot, such as in 2004 when Miami (Ohio) played instead of an SEC squad. In 2008, neither the SEC nor the Big 12 had enough bowl-eligible teams to fill their respective spots resulting in a matchup of Louisiana Tech of the Western Athletic Conference (WAC) and Northern Illinois of the Mid-American Conference (MAC).

In 2010 and 2011, the Independence Bowl held the third selection from the Mountain West Conference and the seventh selection from the Atlantic Coast Conference (ACC). It was announced that in 2012, the Mountain West Conference team would be replaced by the 10th selection from the SEC.

The bowl has multiple conference and team tie-ins for the 2020 through 2025 seasons. Both the SEC and ACC announced bowl lineups for those years that did not include the Independence Bowl. In January 2020, the bowl announced a six-year sequence of games that will feature an independent program (either Army or BYU) against a team from either the Pac-12, Conference USA (C-USA), or the American Athletic Conference (The American), as shown in the table. This is likely to change, however, since BYU is scheduled to join the Big 12 Conference for the 2023–24 school year and will not keep their football independence as a result.

Notable games
One of the most memorable games in Independence Bowl history was the 2000 edition, the "snow bowl" game between Texas A&M and Mississippi State. The game was originally publicized as a reunion game, since Mississippi State coach Jackie Sherrill had served as A&M's coach for seven seasons in the 1980s and led them to three conference titles. However, the weather quickly dominated the storyline as a rare and significant snowstorm hit Shreveport. In the midst of the snow, Mississippi State rallied to an overtime win over A&M.

The bowl has intermittently hosted ranked teams; the first (and to date, only) matchup between ranked opponents (per the AP Poll) was the 1993 edition between No. 22 Virginia Tech and No. 21 Indiana. The highest ranked team to appear was No. 12 BYU in the 2021 edition.

The only tie game in Independence Bowl history was the 1990 edition, between Louisiana Tech and Maryland. The only overtime game has been the aforementioned 2000 edition, between Texas A&M and Mississippi State.

The 2015 edition set a college football bowl record with 76 points scored in one half, occurring in the first half between Tulsa and Virginia Tech.

In 2020, the Independence Bowl issued the first invitation of the bowl season, to Army, in late October. However, the game was ultimately canceled, when organizers were left without an opponent for Army, as there were insufficient teams available to fill all bowl slots. Army was later placed in the Liberty Bowl.

Title sponsor
In 1990, the contest became one of the earliest college bowl games to use a title sponsor, becoming the Poulan Weed-Eater Independence Bowl. Poulan (then a division of AB Electrolux Home Products, now Husqvarna AB) sponsored the game through the 1997 edition. Newell Rubbermaid's Sanford brand of writing products took over sponsorship from 1998 until 2000, while MainStay Investments sponsored from 2001 to 2003. In January 2005, the Deja Vu chain of "gentlemen's clubs" offered to become the title sponsor. The offer was rejected.

The Independence Bowl's three-year search for a title sponsor ended on August 21, 2006, when PetroSun Inc., a Phoenix, Arizona-based company that provides services and products to suppliers of oil and gas, agreed to become the bowl's sponsor. The deal, changing the game's full name to the PetroSun Independence Bowl, was to have run through 2008 with an option for 2009; however the deal was discontinued prior to the 2008 game.

On May 21, 2009, AdvoCare became the fifth title sponsor since the bowl's inception. The bowl was then renamed the AdvoCare V100 Independence Bowl.  AdvoCare makes energy drinks and nutritional supplements sold through multilevel marketing. On February 28, 2013, AdvoCare and the Independence Bowl Foundation announced that the Independence Bowl name would be dropped, and the bowl would be known as the AdvoCare V100 Bowl for the 2013 game. In August 2013, AdvoCare announced it would drop its sponsorship after the 2013 game.

In February 2014, Duck Commander (a duck call and hunting apparel manufacturer founded by former Louisiana Tech quarterback Phil Robertson, made prominent by the reality series Duck Dynasty) announced that it would be the title sponsor for the 2014 bowl, known as the Duck Commander Independence Bowl.  After a year, Duck Commander declined to renew sponsorship, and in July 2015, Camping World was announced as the new title sponsor of the game; Camping World Independence Bowl was the branding of the 2015 and 2016 games. On March 14, 2017, the Independence Bowl Foundation unveiled a new logo for the game, used until a new title sponsor was signed. On October 5, 2017, Walk-On's Bistreaux & Bar was named as the new title sponsor of the game;  Walk-On's Independence Bowl branding was used for the 2017 through 2019 games. On August 8, 2019, Walk On's announced that it would end its sponsorship after the 2019 edition.  On April 28, 2020, Radiance Technologies was announced as the new title sponsor, with the bowl officially named as the Radiance Technologies Independence Bowl.

Independence Stadium

Independence Stadium is a stadium owned by the city of Shreveport, Louisiana. It used to be known as "State Fair Stadium"; it is the site of the annual Independence Bowl post-season college football game, initially (1976) the Bicentennial Bowl.  Before that, it was the home venue of the Shreveport Steamer of the short-lived World Football League (1974–75).  It also served as a neutral site for the annual Arkansas–LSU football rivalry from 1925 to 1936. The stadium is also host to numerous high school football games and soccer matches, since many schools in Shreveport lack an on-campus facility. Independence Stadium also hosted the Louisiana High School Athletic Association state football championship games in 2005 after the Louisiana Superdome suffered heavy damage from Hurricane Katrina. In 1994–95, Independence Stadium was home to the Shreveport Pirates of the Canadian Football League, which was undergoing US expansion at the time. In the late 1990s, the stadium capacity was expanded from approximately 40,000 to 50,832. In 2005, to meet accommodations of the upcoming Independence Bowl in 2006, the stadium went through a renovation to extend the capacity from 52,000 to 59,000. Then in 2008, the City of Shreveport created an entire new section of the stadium. This portion would allow the stadium capacity to be expanded only if need be. This expanse put the total capacity at 63,000. This was part of a grander upgrading plan that improved all aspects of the facility, from concourses to playing surface.

Independence Stadium was considered as a possible playing site for the New Orleans Saints during the 2005 National Football League season due to Hurricane Katrina, but Shreveport eventually lost out to the Alamodome in San Antonio, Texas, and Louisiana State University's Tiger Stadium in Baton Rouge. However, Independence Stadium eventually was chosen to host the Saints' first preseason home game for the 2006 season while the Louisiana Superdome prepared for its grand re-opening. Field Turf was installed on the stadium's playing surface in 2010. In 2010, a Texas UIL playoff game was played featuring Mesquite Horn HS and the technical host Longview.  Longview won, 28–14. In 2011, Independence Stadium hosted the Port City Classic, an NCAA college football competition between Louisiana Tech University of Ruston, Louisiana, and Grambling State University of Grambling, Louisiana. The south end zone of the stadium borders Interstate 20.

Game results
Rankings are based on the AP Poll prior to the game being played.

Source:

MVPs

The bowl names both an offensive and defensive player of the game; on several occasions, the award has been shared.

Source:

Most appearances
Every current member of the SEC except Tennessee, Florida and Kentucky has appeared in the game. Of the 14 current or former members of the Big 12, only Kansas, Texas, Baylor and West Virginia have yet to appear in the game. With the appearance of Duke in the 2018 game, every current or former member of the ACC except Pittsburgh has appeared.

Updated through the December 2022 edition (46 games, 92 total appearances).

Teams with multiple appearances

Teams with a single appearance
Won (16): Arizona, Auburn, Duke, East Carolina, Florida State, Houston, Minnesota, Mississippi State, NC State, Ohio, Syracuse, UAB, Virginia, Wake Forest, Washington, Wisconsin

Lost (23): Army, Boston College, BYU, Clemson, Colorado, Georgia Tech, Indiana, Kansas State, Louisiana, Louisiana–Monroe, Louisville, Miami (OH), Michigan State, Nebraska, North Carolina, Northern Illinois, Notre Dame, Oklahoma, TCU, Temple, Tulane, UTEP, Vanderbilt

Tied (1): Maryland

Appearances by conference
Updated through the December 2022 edition (46 games, 92 total appearances).

 Conferences that are defunct or no longer active in FBS are marked in italics.
 The American's record includes the 1993 appearance of Virginia Tech, at the time a member of the Big East, as The American retains the conference charter following the 2013 split of the original Big East along football lines.
 The Pac-12's record includes appearances from when the conference was the Pac-10.
 Independent appearances: Louisville (1977), East Carolina (1978), Syracuse (1979), Southern Miss (1980, 1988), Virginia Tech (1984), Tulane (1987), Tulsa (1989), Louisiana Tech (1990), Army (1996), Notre Dame (1997), BYU (2021)

Game records

Source:

Media coverage

The bowl was first broadcast nationally in 1979, by WTBS. It has subsequently been broadcast by Mizlou (1980–1990), ABC (1991), and ESPN or ESPN2 since then, with the exception of a one-year return to ABC in 2014.

Notes

External links
 

 
College football bowls
Recurring sporting events established in 1976